Charles Lewis Gerlach (September 14, 1895 – May 5, 1947) was a Republican member of the U.S. House of Representatives from Pennsylvania.

Biography
Charles Lewis Gerlach was born in Bethlehem, Pennsylvania. In 1914, he moved to Allentown, Pennsylvania, where he became the organizer, and later president, of a fuel and heating supply company.

A Republican State committeeman in 1936 and 1937, he was elected to the 76th Congress in 1938, and served until his 1947 death in Allentown.

A confidential 1943 analysis of the House Foreign Affairs Committee by Isaiah Berlin for the British Foreign Office described Gerlach as:

See also

 List of United States Congress members who died in office (1900–49)

References

1895 births
1947 deaths
Politicians from Allentown, Pennsylvania
Politicians from Bethlehem, Pennsylvania
Republican Party members of the United States House of Representatives from Pennsylvania
20th-century American politicians